Judge John W. Wright Cottage, also known as "Wisteria Cottage," is a historic home located at Berkeley Springs, Morgan County, West Virginia.  It was built in 1872, and is a two-story, frame residence of board-and-batten construction in the late Italianate style. It features a simple hipped roof and a three-sided Victorian-era verandah and a one-story gable-roofed kitchen wing.  The house was originally built as a summer home for John W. Wright, an influential 19th-century Federal jurist and associate of Abraham Lincoln.

It was listed on the National Register of Historic Places in 1986.  It is located within the Town of Bath Historic District, listed on the National Register of Historic Places in 2009.

References

Bath (Berkeley Springs), West Virginia
Houses on the National Register of Historic Places in West Virginia
Italianate architecture in West Virginia
Houses completed in 1872
Houses in Morgan County, West Virginia
National Register of Historic Places in Morgan County, West Virginia
Individually listed contributing properties to historic districts on the National Register in West Virginia